Earl McDonald (October 2, 1885 – April 28, 1949) was an American singer and jug blower, noted as a pioneer in creating and recording jug band music.

He was born in Louisville, Kentucky. He formed his first jug band in 1902 and toured widely, performing in New York City and Chicago by 1914. Later he established the Original Louisville Jug Band and the Old Southern Jug Band, which recorded in 1924 with the singer Sara Martin and the fiddle player Clifford Hayes, joining with Hayes to form the Dixieland Jug Blowers for recordings. In the 1920s and early 1930s, he performed regularly with his band, the Ballard Chefs, on radio station WHAS, helping to popularize jug band music, and made over 40 recordings.

McDonald died in Louisville in 1949 and was buried in an unmarked grave. A gravestone was provided in 2009 at the instigation of supporters of the annual Jug Band Jubilee.

References

1885 births
1949 deaths
Jug band musicians
Musicians from Louisville, Kentucky
Singers from Kentucky
20th-century African-American male singers